William Galvin, Bill Galvin or Billy Galvin may refer to:
William F. Galvin (born 1950), Massachusetts Secretary of the Commonwealth
William C. Galvin (born 1956), Massachusetts state representative
William J. Galvin (1904–1988), Boston city councilor
Bill Galvin (Australian politician) (1903–1966), Victorian state politician
Billy Galvin, a 1986 film
William (Billy) Galvin III (born 2007), American high school basketball player